Blysmus is a genus of sedges of the family Cyperaceae, found in temperate regions across the Northern Hemisphere.

Species
Species currently accepted by The Plant List are as follows: 
Blysmus compressus (L.) Panz. ex Link
Blysmus mongolicola Kitag.
Blysmus rufus (Huds.) Link
Blysmus sinocompressus Tang & F.T.Wang

References

Cyperaceae genera
Cyperaceae